Hesso, Margrave of Baden-Baden (1268 – 13 February 1297) was a son of Rudolf I and his wife, Kunigunde of Eberstein.  After his father died in 1288, he ruled the Margraviate of Baden jointly with his brothers Rudolf II, Herman VII and Rudolf III.

Hesso married three times:
 Clara (d. before 10 June 1291), a daughter of Count Walter III of Klingen.  With her, he had a son:
 Herman VIII (d. 1338)
 Irmengard (1261/64 – before 1295), a daughter of Count Ulrich I of Württemberg and Agnes of Legnica
 Adelaide (d. 1299), a daughter of Count Gerhard IV of Rieneck.  With her, he had another son:
 Rudolf Hesso (d. 13 August 1335)

Margraves of Baden-Baden
Year of birth uncertain
1297 deaths
13th-century German nobility
1268 births